Demi Schuurs and Renata Voráčová were the defending champions, but both players chose not to participate.

Chang Kai-chen and Han Xinyun won the title after defeating Montserrat González and Sílvia Soler Espinosa 7–5, 6–1 in the final.

Seeds

Draw

References
Main Draw

Engie Open Saint-Gaudens Occitanie - Doubles